Enteucha guajavae is a moth of the family Nepticulidae. It is found on the western foothills of the Andes in Ecuador, but probably has a much wider distribution.

The wingspan is 3.1-3.6 mm. Adults have been found in February.

The larvae feed on Psidium guajava. They mine the leaves of their host plant. The mine consists of a slender, sinuous gallery, which may be short or relatively long and is mostly located on the upperside of the leaf. In the first half, the black frass can fill most of the width of the gallery but still leaving clear margins. In the second half, the frass is deposited in a central line with broader margins.

External links
New Neotropical Nepticulidae (Lepidoptera) from the western Amazonian rainforest and the Andes of Ecuador

Nepticulidae
Moths of South America
Moths described in 2002